Bart Dockx (born 2 September 1981 in Turnhout, Antwerp) is a former Belgian professional road bicycle racer, who competed as a professional from 2004 to 2011.

Palmarès 

 Oostrozebeke (2004)
 Vlaamse Pijl (2002)
 3rd, National U23 Road Race Championship (2002)

External links 

Belgian male cyclists
1981 births
Living people
Sportspeople from Turnhout
Cyclists from Antwerp Province